Charles Kouyos (10 February 1928 – 12 December 1994) was a French sport wrestler. He was born in Marseille. He won a bronze medal in freestyle wrestling, bantamweight class, at the 1948 Summer Olympics in London.

References

External links

1928 births
1994 deaths
Sportspeople from Marseille
Wrestlers at the 1948 Summer Olympics
Wrestlers at the 1952 Summer Olympics
French male sport wrestlers
Olympic wrestlers of France
Olympic bronze medalists for France
Olympic medalists in wrestling
Medalists at the 1948 Summer Olympics